Franco Riccardi (13 June 1905 – 24 May 1968) was one of the greatest Italian fencer and Olympic champion in épée competition.

Biography
He received a gold medal in épée individual at the 1936 Summer Olympics in Berlin. He received a gold medal in épée team in 1928 and in 1936, and a silver medal in 1932.

References

External links
 

1905 births
1968 deaths
Italian male fencers
Olympic fencers of Italy
Fencers at the 1928 Summer Olympics
Fencers at the 1932 Summer Olympics
Fencers at the 1936 Summer Olympics
Olympic gold medalists for Italy
Olympic silver medalists for Italy
Olympic medalists in fencing
Medalists at the 1928 Summer Olympics
Medalists at the 1932 Summer Olympics
Medalists at the 1936 Summer Olympics